Jean Quiquampoix (born 3 November 1995) is a French sports shooter. He competed in the men's 25 metre rapid fire pistol event at the 2016 Summer Olympics where he won the silver medal.

References

External links
 

1995 births
Living people
French male sport shooters
Olympic shooters of France
Shooters at the 2016 Summer Olympics
Place of birth missing (living people)
Medalists at the 2016 Summer Olympics
Olympic silver medalists for France
Olympic medalists in shooting
Universiade medalists in shooting
ISSF pistol shooters
Sport shooters from Paris
Universiade gold medalists for France
Universiade silver medalists for France
Shooters at the 2019 European Games
European Games medalists in shooting
European Games silver medalists for France
Medalists at the 2015 Summer Universiade
Shooters at the 2020 Summer Olympics
Medalists at the 2020 Summer Olympics
Olympic gold medalists for France
21st-century French people